Gil Goldschein is an American television producer known for his work on Project Runway, Total Divas, Valerie's Home Cooking, and Keeping Up with the Kardashians and its spinoffs.

Career
Goldschein joined Bunim/Murray Productions in 2001 as the director of business and affairs. He later served as general counsel. In 2007, he became chief operating officer. In 2010, Goldschein was promoted to president of Bunim/Murray. In April 2015, Goldschein was promoted to chairman and CEO of Bunim/Murray Productions after founder Jonathan Murray stepped down. He left the company in February 2021.

Awards
Goldschein has received two Emmy Awards for his producing and has been nominated seventeen times. His shows also received a GLAAD Award, three CINE Golden Eagle Awards, one Imagen Award, and a Webby Award.

Filmography

Television

Film

References

External links

Living people
Year of birth missing (living people)
American television producers
Television show creators